Poupée de cire, poupée de son is the fourth album by French singer France Gall where she is accompanied by Alain Goraguer and His Orchestra. It was released in April 1965.

Track listing

References

France Gall albums
Philips Records albums
1965 albums